

Events

Works
 Gautier de Metz wrote L'Image du monde (French, The Image of the world), a work in poem form about creation

Births
 Henry Bate of Malines (died 1310), Flemish philosopher, theologian, astronomer, astrologer, poet, and musician

Deaths
 Pons d'Ortaffa (born 1170), Catalan nobleman and troubadour

13th-century poetry
Poetry